Rassvet is a rural locality (a selo) and the administrative center of Rassvetsky Selsoviet, Narimanovsky District, Astrakhan Oblast, Russia. The population was 1,338 as of 2010. There are 39 streets.

Geography 
Rassvet is located 22 km south of Narimanov (the district's administrative centre) by road. Tinaki 2-ye is the nearest rural locality.

References 

Rural localities in Narimanovsky District